Maria Teresa Beccari (26 June 1950 – 7 May 2020) was a Sammarinese politician, Mayor (Capitano di Castello) of the City of San Marino between 13 December 2009 and 31 October 2018.

She was elected in the office after the 7 June 2009 local elections were repeated on November for City of San Marino municipality.  

In the 2014 Sammarinese local elections her candidacy, named Continuity and Innovation obtained the 52'9% of the votes and was reelected Mayor. She resigned for personal reasons on 31 October 2018, and was succeeded by Tomaso Rossini.

Beccari died on 7 May 2020 at the age of 69 after a long illness. Her funeral was held on 12 May.

References

1950 births
2020 deaths
People from the City of San Marino
Mayors of places in San Marino
Women mayors of places in San Marino
Sammarinese women in politics
21st-century women politicians